Malcolm Jenkins (born 27 December 1944) is a British former sports shooter. He competed in the mixed trap event at the 1976 Summer Olympics.

References

Living people
1944 births
British male sport shooters
Olympic shooters of Great Britain
Shooters at the 1976 Summer Olympics
Place of birth missing (living people)
20th-century British people